Henry's Tavern is a small chain of bars and restaurants. It currently exists in two locations, one in Portland International Airport, and another in Denver, Colorado.

History 
The original Henry's Tavern was a bar and restaurant in the Weinhard Brewery Complex at 12th Avenue and Burnside Street, in northwest Portland's Pearl District. Named after Henry Weinhard, the restaurant had more than 100 beers on tap. Plans for locations in Bellevue and Seattle's South Lake Union neighborhood were announced in 2017. 

In July 2019, Henry's parent company, Restaurants Unlimited Inc, declared bankruptcy, and by September had closed the original Henry's location, along with its locations in  Seattle, Bellevue, and Plano, Texas.

References

External links

 

Defunct restaurants in Seattle
Defunct restaurants in Texas
Pearl District, Portland, Oregon
Portland International Airport
Restaurant chains in the United States
Restaurants in Denver
Restaurants in Portland, Oregon
South Lake Union, Seattle